Mourlon is a French surname. Notable people with the surname include:

André Mourlon (1903–1970), French sprint runner
Benoît Mourlon (born 1988), French association football player 
René Mourlon (1893–1977), French sprint runner, brother of André

French-language surnames